Beyond Reasonable Doubt is a 1980 New Zealand docu-drama feature film directed by John Laing and starring David Hemmings, John Hargreaves, Roy Billing, and Terence Cooper.

Plot synopsis
Arthur Allan Thomas is falsely convicted for the murder of Harvey and Jeanette Crewe and is later pardoned after 9 years in prison.

Cast
 David Hemmings as Inspector Bruce Hutton
 John Hargreaves as Arthur Allan Thomas
 Tony Barry as Detective John Hughes
 Martyn Sanderson as Len Demler
 Terence Cooper as Paul Temm
 Roy Billing as Court Official

Reception
The film was the second highest-grossing New Zealand film in New Zealand at the time with a gross of $350,000, behind Sleeping Dogs (1977).

The film received mixed reviews which has largely been attributed to its avoidance of genre clichés. The film did receive praise when it screened at the 1981 Chicago Film Festival, with director John Laing recalling that "the audience was passionate". The film also received praise from Roger Ebert in the Chicago Sun Times where he described it as a "remarkable film".

In New Zealand the film was well received with Punch stating that it "inspires respect" and suggesting that the film "stirs [hope] that New Zealand may be about to join the cinema producing countries". Due to the high-profile nature of the case in New Zealand the film was described as a "story that a lot of people in the country wanted to forget about". In spite of this the film was New Zealand's most successful film until the release of Goodbye Pork Pie the following year.

References

Further reading

External links
 Beyond Reasonable Doubt – New Zealand Film Commission synopsis 
 
 NZ On Screen page

1980 films
1980 drama films
1980s New Zealand films
Docudrama films
Films set in New Zealand
Films about miscarriage of justice
Films based on non-fiction books
1980 directorial debut films
New Zealand drama films
Films directed by John Laing
1980s English-language films